is a former Japanese football player. She played for Japan national team.

Club career
Tsuchihashi was born in Anan on January 16, 1980. After graduating from Osaka University of Health and Sport Sciences, she joined Tasaki Perule FC in 2002. In 2006, she moved to Ohara Gakuen JaSRA. In 2007, she moved to Urawa Reds. She was selected Best Eleven in 2009. She retired end of 2012 season.

National team career
On August 5, 2001, when Tsuchihashi was an Osaka University of Health and Sport Sciences student, she debuted for Japan national team against China. She played at 2001 AFC Championship. She played 4 games for Japan in 2001.

National team statistics

References

External links
Urawa Reds

1980 births
Living people
Osaka University of Health and Sport Sciences alumni
Association football people from Tokushima Prefecture
Japanese women's footballers
Japan women's international footballers
Nadeshiko League players
Tasaki Perule FC players
AC Nagano Parceiro Ladies players
Urawa Red Diamonds Ladies players
Women's association football defenders